Feels So Good is a 1977 jazz album released by Chuck Mangione. It contains his hit single, the title song "Feels So Good", which in an edited form reached No. 4 on the U.S. charts. The song also reached the top of the Billboard adult contemporary chart. It was also frequently referenced on the  animated television comedy King of the Hill, on which Mangione had a recurring voice role as himself.

The album Feels So Good peaked at No. 2 on the Billboard albums chart in 1978, behind the Saturday Night Fever soundtrack.

Track listing
All selections written by Chuck Mangione.
"Feels So Good" – 9:42
"Maui-Waui" – 10:13
"Theme from Side Street" – 2:05
"Hide and Seek (Ready or Not Here I Come)" – 6:25
"Last Dance" – 10:54
"The XIth Commandment" – 6:36

Charts

Weekly charts

Year-end charts

Musicians
Chuck Mangione: flugelhorn, electric piano
Chris Vadala: soprano, alto and baritone saxes; piccolo, flute and alto flute
Grant Geissman: electric, acoustic, 12-string and classical guitars
Charles Meeks: bass
James Bradley, Jr.: drums, congas, timbales

References

1977 albums
A&M Records albums
Chuck Mangione albums
Smooth jazz albums